Matthew Patrick (13 June 1919 – 14 July 2005) was a Scottish footballer.

Patrick joined York City from Cowdenbeath in 1946. He later retired at the club.

Notes

1919 births
2005 deaths
Scottish footballers
Association football wingers
Cowdenbeath F.C. players
York City F.C. players
English Football League players
Association football inside forwards